Sia ferox (also known as Riokku (リオック, loanword from the Indonesian name) or Obakekorogisu (オバケコロギス, "Obake raspy cricket") in Japan) is a species of cricket that lives in Indonesia. It belongs to the family Stenopelmatidae and the genus Sia.

Appearance
Although its basic form is similar to other Stenopelmatoidea, it is relatively elongated. Its body-color is brown. The female has a rudimentary ovipositor, unlike true Gryllacrididae or Anostostomatidae species. It is similar to Jerusalem crickets, but it is the only species of Stenopelmatidae that lives in Indonesia, and the related species Sia incisa occurs in Malaysia.

Ecology
The species is a nocturnal predatory cricket that preys on other insects found at the bottom of the rainforest. Like other Stenopelmatidae species, Sia ferox usually hides in its burrow during the day. At night, it comes out from its burrow and searches for prey like spiders, grasshoppers, and other crickets. The detailed ecology of S. ferox is not known due to insufficient research.

References

External links
 
 

Stenopelmatoidea
Insects described in 1861